Ślesińskie Lake is a lake in central Poland known as Jezioro Ślesińskie in Polish. It is located in Konin County in Gmina Ślesin, near the town of Licheń Stary. It is a post-glacial ribbon lake with a strongly developed shoreline. To the south it is connected to  Mikorzyńskie Lake. It is part of the 32-kilometer navigable Ślesińskie Canal. It is one of several lakes known collectively as the heated Konin Lakes because the water temperature is raised as a result of the outflow received from two power stations.

The lake is a tourist attraction and is used for water sports including water-skiing and wakeboarding. A special zone has been set up for motorboat sports and a ski slalom course is constructed each summer. Training is available and there are facilities for launching personal watercraft.

References

Lakes of Poland